Karyotakis is a Greek television series that was aired by ET1 in 2009. The series was directed by Tassos Psarras and it stars Demosthenis Papadopoulos and Maria Kitsiou. It is a biographical series about the life of the Greek poet Kostas Karyotakis. It won 4 awards in Greek television awards and it is considered one of the best Greek television productions.

Plot
The series is a biography about the life of the Greek poet Kostas Karyotakis. The series follows his life from his childhood to his death. It focuses in his artistic and political action as well as in his relationship with the poet Maria Polydouri. Through to Karyotakis' life the series presents the turbulent period of the interwar Greek history.

Cast
Dimosthenis Papadopoulos 
Maria Kitsou
Ilias Logothetis
Giorgos Armenis
Dimitris Imellos
Manos Vakousis
Stefania Goulioti
Kora Karvouni
Errikos Litsis

Awards
The series won 4 television awards in "Prosopa" Greek Television Awards:

References

External links

Hellenic Broadcasting Corporation original programming
Greek drama television series
2009 Greek television series debuts
2009 Greek television series endings
2000s Greek television series